The Lupus Research Alliance (LRA) is an American voluntary health organization based in New York City whose mission is to find better treatments and ultimately prevent and cure systemic lupus erythematosus (SLE or lupus), a debilitating autoimmune disease, through supporting medical research. The organization was born from the merger of three organizations: the Lupus Research Institute (LRI) and the S.L.E. Lupus Foundation with the Alliance for Lupus Research (ALR), which was founded by Robert Wood "Woody" Johnson IV, a member of the Johnson & Johnson family and owner of the New York Jets. As of 2020 the LRA's cumulative research commitment was $220,000,000.

History
The Lupus Research Alliance (LRA) was founded as The Alliance for Lupus Research in 1999 by former chairperson Woody Johnson, a member of the founding family of Johnson & Johnson and owner of the New York Jets. The organizations's fundraising efforts include committing money to lupus research and charity walk-a-thons under the "Walk with Us to Cure Lupus" program, which raises funds and public awareness of the disease.

Research funding
The hallmark of LRA's operations are an emphasis on multidisciplinary science. A keen focus on research that can be moved quickly from the laboratory to a patient's bedside. Research funded by the LRA has included the 2008 International SLE Genetics Consortium (SLEGEN), which identified several genes associated with lupus.

The Lupus Research Alliance has given more money to lupus research than any non-governmental agency in the world. As of 2015 the LRA's cumulative research commitment was over $100,000,000. making it the largest lupus research organization and the only organization the funds lupus biomedical research internationally. One hundred percent of all donations from the public including donations in support of the "Walk with Us to Cure Lupus" program go directly to research programs because the LRA's board of directors funds all administrative and fundraising costs. LRA uses a peer review system to make all funding decisions.

References

External links
 Lupus Research Alliance official website

Biomedical research foundations
Lupus organizations
Organizations established in 1999
Health charities in the United States
Medical and health organizations based in New York City
1999 establishments in New York City